Nat Khat Mhar Tae Tite Pwal, is a 2015 Burmese action drama film starring Nay Toe, Thet Mon Myint and Yadanar Phyu Phyu Aung. It is an unofficial remake of the 2006 Indian film Varalaru. The film, produced by Star World Film Production premiered in Myanmar on November 27, 2015.

Cast
Nay Toe as Let Yar, Ye Yint and U Za Byu (triple role)
Thet Mon Myint as Pann Pan
Yadanar Phyu Phyu Aung as Nora
 War War Aung as Pann Pan's mother
 Zin Oo as Nora's mother
 May Thinzar Oo as U Za Byu's mother
 Nay San as doctor

Awards and nominations

References

2015 films
2010s Burmese-language films
Burmese action films
Films shot in Myanmar
Remakes of Indian films